James John O'Malley (born July 24, 1951) is a former American football linebacker who played for the Denver Broncos of the National Football League (NFL). He played college football at University of Notre Dame.

References 

1951 births
Living people
American football linebackers
Notre Dame Fighting Irish football players
Denver Broncos players
Sportspeople from Summit, New Jersey